The New Bern Formation is a geologic formation in North Carolina. It preserves fossils dating back to the Paleogene period.

See also

 List of fossiliferous stratigraphic units in North Carolina

References
 

Paleogene geology of North Carolina